The Russia men's national under-18 ice hockey team is the men's national under-18 ice hockey team of Russia. The team is controlled by the Ice Hockey Federation of Russia, a member of the International Ice Hockey Federation. The team represents Russia at the IIHF World U18 Championships.

International competitions

IIHF European U18 Championships

1992:  Bronze
1993:  Silver
1994:  Silver

1995: 4th place
1996:  Gold
1997: 4th place
1998:  Bronze

IIHF World U18 Championships

1999: 6th place
2000:  Silver
2001:  Gold
2002:  Silver
2003:  Bronze
2004:  Gold
2005: 5th place
2006: 5th place
2007:  Gold
2008:  Silver

2009:  Silver
2010: 4th place
2011:  Bronze
2012: 4th place
2013: 4th place
2014: 5th place
2015: 5th place
2016: 6th place
2017:  Bronze
2018: 6th place
2019:  Silver
2021:  Silver

Hlinka Gretzky Cup

1992:  Silver
1993:  Gold
1994:  Bronze
1995:  Gold
1996: Did not compete
1997: Did not compete
1998: Did not compete
1999: Did not compete
2000: Did not compete
2001:  Bronze
2002:  Bronze
2003:  Silver
2004: 5th place
2005: 4th place
2006:  Bronze
2007:  Bronze

2008:  Silver
2009:  Silver
2010: 5th place
2011:  Bronze
2012: 5th place
2013: 4th place
2014: 7th place
2015:  Bronze
2016:  Bronze
2017: 4th place
2018:  Bronze
2019:  Gold

References

External links
 Team Russia all time scoring leaders in IIHF U18 World Championships
Russian men's national under 18 ice hockey team 
Russia at IIHF.com

 

under
National under-18 ice hockey teams